The 1908 Haskell Indians football team was an American football team that represented the Haskell Indian Institute (now known as Haskell Indian Nations University) as an independent during the 1908 college football season. In its first season under head coach John R. Bender, Haskell compiled a 3–5–1 record and was outscored by a total of 79 to 65.

The teams played games against five teams that now play in Power Five conferences: a victory over Texas A&M and losses to Arkansas, Nebraska, LSU, and Alabama.

Schedule

References

Haskell
Haskell Indian Nations Fighting Indians football seasons
Haskell Indians football